Troezen (ancient Greek: Τροιζήν, modern Greek: Τροιζήνα ) is a small town and a former municipality in the northeastern Peloponnese, Greece, on the Argolid Peninsula. Since the 2011 local government reform it is part of the municipality Troizinia-Methana, of which it is a municipal unit. It is part of the Islands regional unit.

Troezen is located southwest of Athens, across the Saronic Gulf, and a few miles south of Methana. The seat of the former municipality (pop. 6,507) was in Galatas. Before 2011, Troizina was part of the Argolis and Korinthos prefecture from 1833 to 1925, Attica prefecture from 1925 to 1964, Piraeus Prefecture from 1964 to 1972 and then back in Attica prefecture (in antiquity it was part of Argolis). The municipality had a land area of 190.697 km². Its largest towns and villages are Galatás (pop. 2,195 in 2011), Kalloní (pop. 669), Troizína (pop. 673), Taktikoúpoli (250), Karatzás (287), Dryópi (239), Ágios Geórgios (228), and Agía Eléni (159). There are numerous smaller settlements.

Mythology 

According to Greek mythology, Troezen came into being as a result of two ancient cities, Hyperea and Antheia, being unified by Pittheus, who named the new city in honor of his deceased brother, Troezen.

Troezen was where Aethra, daughter of Pittheus, slept with both Aegeus and Poseidon on the same night and fell pregnant with the great Greek hero Theseus. Before returning to Athens, Aegeus left his sandals and sword under a large boulder in Troezen and requested that when the child was able to prove himself by moving the boulder, he must return the items to his father in Athens; Theseus lifted the boulder when he came of age.

Troezen is the setting of Euripides' tragedy Hippolytus, which recounts the story of the eponymous son of Theseus who becomes the subject of the love of his stepmother, Phaedra. While fleeing the city, Hippolytus is killed when his chariot is attacked by a bull rising from the sea. Other plays on the same subject have been written by Seneca and Jean Racine, which are also set in Troezen.

The ancient city had a spring that was supposedly formed where the winged horse Pegasus once came to ground.

History 
A cult built up in the ancient city around the legend of Hippolytus. Troezen girls traditionally dedicated a lock of their hair to him before their marriage.

Sybaris in Magna Graecia was a Troezenian colony (founded 720 BC).

Before the Battle of Salamis (480 BC), Athenian women and children were sent to Troezen for safety on the instructions of the Athenian statesman Themistocles. In 1959, a stele was found in a coffee house in Troezen, depicting the Decree of Themistocles, the order to evacuate Athens. The stele has since been dated to some 200 years after the Battle of Salamis, indicating that it is probably a commemorative copy of the original order.

The temple of Isis was built by the Halicarnassians in Troezen because it was their mother-city, but the image of Isis was dedicated by the people of Troezen. The city also bore the name Apollonia in antiquity.

In the Middle Ages, it was known as Damala (Δαμαλᾶ) and was the seat of a barony of the Principality of Achaea.

References

 
Cities in ancient Peloponnese
Battle of Salamis
Populated places in ancient Argolis
Troizinia-Methana
Populated places in Islands (regional unit)